Moyross railway station is a proposed railway station projected to be built in the suburb of Moyross, Limerick in Ireland. If built as proposed, it is due to be located along the Limerick to Galway railway line, with a projected journey time between Limerick Colbert railway station and Moyross of "less than nine minutes". As of late 2022, the station was projected to be open by 2025.

Plans for the station were announced in October 2022 as part of the then Irish government's Pathfinder Programme. As of November 2022, Iarnród Éireann was reportedly seeking to "identify a good location and building for the station".

Rail transport in Limerick is organised under the Limerick Shannon Metropolitan Area Transport Strategy (LSMATS). Other transit improvements proposed under LSMATS include a potential new station at Ballysimon and "more frequent services" on the Ballybrophy line.

References

Proposed railway stations in the Republic of Ireland